Diraar ibn al-Azwar also spelled as Diraar or Dhiraar (original name Diraar ibn Malik), was a skilled warrior since before the time of Islam who participated in the Early Muslim conquests and a companion of the Islamic prophet Muhammad. Dhiraar was known to his tribe as al-Azwar. Dhiraar was the brother of the renowned female warrior (Khawlah bint al-Azwa).

Dhiraar was feared by the Byzantine army and was given the nickname The barechested Warrior or The barechested Champion for his tendency to fight without armor or upper garments. Diraar mostly known for killing three dozen enemy commanders and champions in the Battle of Ajnadayn, blocking the enemy retreat in the Battle of Yarmouk, and killing more than a hundred soldiers single handedly in the siege of Oxyrhynchus Bahnasa.

Diraar was a member of the elite Rashidun cavalry unit and also a dueling specialist of the Rashidun Army operating mostly under the famous general Khalid ibn al-Walid, who trusted him in various tasks during Ridda wars, Muslim conquest of the Levant, Persia,  North Africa and Muslim conquest of Egypt. Historians agreed Dhiraar died due the Plague of Amwas during the later stage of the Levant campaign. Muslim scholars and chroniclers honored Dhiraar due to his status as Companion of Muhammad and
during the modern era his descendants known as Dharri tribe were spread mostly in Iraq.

Biography 

Dhiraar belonged to the Arab tribe of Banu Asad. The son of one of its chieftains, known as al-Azwar Malik, the sixth generation descendant of Asad ibn Khuzaymah, the progenitor of Asad tribe who descended from seventh generation from Adnan. Dhiraar became Muslim after the Battle of the Trench, as he was sent with Tulayha ibn Khuwailid by Asad clan and then to urging them to embrace Islam after his visit to the prophet of Islam. Dhiraar's family was among the first converts to Islam. Muhammad admonished that it is allowed for Muslims to possess property which he gained before he convert to Islam. It is recorded Dhiraar were known as very wealthy person as it was said that he possessed a thousand camels.

During the initial period of the Ridda Wars, Dhiraar was a tax collector, Dhiraar were one of the Arabian clansmen from Asad that staying loyal and pledge allegiance to the Islam government in Medina, as he pledge his allegiance to the newly appointed caliph, Abu Bakar, Dhiraar show his loyalty by warned and chastised the conduct of the peoples who rebelled against the caliphate. Later, he participated as a scout for the elite cavalry of Rashidun, led by the general Khalid ibn al-Walid. Dhiraar was sent  to quell this rebellion. Dhiraar was sent by Khalid to lead a detachment consisting of Banu Tamim warriors to confront Malik ibn Nuwayrah, chief of the Bani Yarbu', a Banu Tamim clan, on accusations of apostasy. Dhiraar participated in Battle of Yamama, where he testified that around 7,000 followers of Musaylima killed in the battlefield, the plain of Aqraba, while 7,000 others were killed inside their fortress, in a garden which called "The garden of death".

Conquest of Iraq 

Dhiraar participated in the first Muslim conquest of Persia under Khalid ibn al-Walid, which immediately occurred after Ridda wars. Dhiraar played pivotal role in the battle of Walaja as he was assigned as one of two cavalry commanders that tasked to lead detachments of Rashidun cavalries to struck the advancing Sassanid army from the rear and trap themin double envelopment maneuver strategy designed by Khalid.

In the year of 12 Hijr during the battle of Hira, Dhiraar and Ayas ibn Qubaisah were tasked to subdue the fortress of al-Qasr al-Abyad where he asked the fortress to surrender. However, the fortress garrison resisting and throwing the Rashidun soldiers under Dhiraar with "cylindrical ceramic rollers". Dhiraar in response ordering his soldiers to showering the fortress wall with arrows, and continued to storming the peoples outside the fortress, before they breach inside and captured the houses and monasteries inside al-Qasr al-Abyad. This caused the residents to immediately surrender to Dhiraar.

Later, Dhiraar were recorded along with Dhiraar ibn al-Khattab, Al-Muthanna ibn Haritha, and Dhiraar ibn al-Muqarrin to be appointed as quarter commanders of Rashidun garrison in al-Sib. Dhiraar and the others mounted raids that penetrated into area that reached the bank of Tigris river.

Conquest of Levant 

The Rashidun army left the capital Medina probably in the autumn of 633 or at the beginning of 634. They first engaged and defeated the Byzantines at Dathin on February 4; after that, Emperor Heraclius, then stationed in Emesa (now Homs, Syria), had reinforcements sent south to protect Caesarea Maritima. As a possible reaction, commander Khalid ibn al-Walid was ordered to aid Abu Ubayda ibn al-Jarrah in Syria. At sometime before the Siege of Emesa city, a Byzantine commander from Baalbek named Harbees collided with patrolling troops of Rashidun which led by Dhiraar, Amr ibn Ma'adi Yakrib, Abdul Rahman ibn Abi Bakr, Rabia ibn Amr, Malik Al-Ashtar. The forces of Harbees swiftly demolished by the Rashidun troops of Amr, which caused the city of Emesa captured in no time as there are no more adequate defense left. Dhiraar and Amr then continues by leading more than 5,000 cavalry troops joining Maysarah ibn Masruq to besiege Homs.

Battle of Ajnadayn 
According to George Nafziger, Dhiraar accomplished several impressive feats during the Battle of Ajnadayn, where he reportedly slew multiple Byzantine champions including two provincial governors. At one point, Dhiraar impetuously confronted Khalid and asked:

Waqidi recorded another event in which Dhiraar duels against Vahan. Dhiraar unfastened and discarded his armor and upper garments during the duel, thus continuing bare-chested. In a very fierce duel, Dhiraar eventually spears Vahan through the chest, killing him. He then continues on, charging through the Byzantine ranks and killing at least three dozen Byzantine soldiers alone, according to witnesses. The deaths of the Byzantine commanders sowed disorder and loss of morale among the Byzantine ranks, which Khalid used to his strategic advantage.

Further battles in Levant 
After the defeat of the Byzantine-allied Ghassanids by April 24, Khalid's force was able to enter Bosra, Syria almost unopposed. Dhiraar once captured by Byzantine forces during the Battle of Eagle Pass, which occurred during the siege of Damascus. Shortly later, he was rescued by a team led by his sister, Khawlah ibnt al-Azwar. Then as Dhiraar participated in the Siege of Damascus. Later in the same year, Dhiraar were appointed by Khalid as cavalry commander during the battle of Fahl.

During the siege of al-Rastan, it is recorded that the supreme commander of Rashidun, Abu Ubaydah, employing certai plan that allowed Dhiraar and about 20 warriors which included Al-Musayyab bin Najba, Dhul-Kalaa Al-Himyari, Amr bin Ma;di Yakrib Al-Zubaidi, Hashim ibn Utba, Qays ibn Makshuh, Abd Al-Rahman bin Abi Bakr Al-Siddiq, Malik bin Al-Ashtar, and others to enter the city, and causing riot inside which thrown the entire city to confusion, and opening the gate from inside to allow the Muslim forces waiting outside to overwhelm the defense, thus allowing the city to be captured despite it has very strong fortification defense.

Battle of Yarmuk 

In the battle of Yarmouk, Dhiraar were placed on the left wing which commanded by Yazid ibn Abi Sufyan, leading his personal squadron among other dozen squadrons of the left wing. Dhiraar serving largely during this battle in the unit of elite cavalry which called the Mobile Guards, which specifically tasked to plugging the gaps between Muslim ranks to avoid enemy penetration. It is recorded that in one particular clash, as a rank of Muslims fell back at the Byzantine onslaught, Dhiraar then gathered together with Ikrimah ibn Abi Jahl, stood firm with 400 men holding the deserted line and successfully defending the Muslim position until the fleeing Muslim ranks returned to the battlefield and reinforced the position again. The circumstances were expounded on in Tabari's comprehensive history wherein Ikrimah is recorded as saying:

Al-Harith ibn Hisham and Diraar ibn Al-Azwar both swore an oath along with 400 of notable men and knights. They fought in front of Khalid's command tent until all of them were disabled by wounds. Many of them died after the clash due to heavy wounds including Ikrimah, Although some like Dhiraar were able to recover.

In the final day of the battle, Dhiraar played a prominent role when Khalid assigned him to capture a bridge at Ayn al-Dhakar to safely cross the deep gorges of the ravines of Wadi-ur-Ruqqad with 500 soldiers at the night of the fifth day. He was then ordered by Khalid to set an ambush there to eliminate the Byzantine armies who had been routed and who intended to use this bridge as a way to withdraw. The next day, Dhiraar moved with 500 mounted troops around the northern flank of the Byzantines and captured the bridge. The plan was successful as the Byzantines retreated onto this path, where Dhiraar had been waiting for them in Wadi ar-Raqqad Bridge. The Byzantines were surrounded from all sides now. Some fell into the deep ravines off the steep slopes, others tried to escape in the waters, only to be smashed on the rocks below and again others were killed in their flight.

Battle of Qadisiyyah 

Later, Caliph Umar instructed a portion of the Rashidun troops from Yarmouk to be transferred to Iraq as reinforcements to assist Sa'd ibn Abi Waqqas in the Battle of al-Qādisiyyah against the Sassanid Empire and Dhiraar was counted among them. At this stage, Ya'qubi has recorded, that, along with Dhiraar bin Al-Azwar, Amr ibn Ma'adi Yakrib, Tulayha, and Kurt ibn Jammah al-Abdi has discovered the corpse of Rostam farrokhzad, the highest commander of Sassanid army during this battle. The death of Rostam shocked the entire Sassanid, which prompted Sa'd to instruct general assault to all the Muslim soldiers.

Conquest of Africa 

Later, According to Waqidi, during the Muslim conquest of Egypt, Dhiraar participated the campaign under Miqdad ibn Aswad and pacified several areas in al-Gharbia region, started from Kafr Tanah (area in modern day Dakahlia Governorate), and Tennis. Then Miqdad continued his march leading forty horsemen which included Dhiraar. Then as they reached Damietta, Miqdad found the city was fortified by a man named al-Hammuk, an uncle of Al-Muqawqis. Al-Hammuk fortified the city and closed the gates, as Miqdad besieged the city. As Damietta subdued, Miqdad were appointed to govern the city.

Later, Dhiraar were mentioned again involved in the Muslim campaign to Bahnasa. Amr ibn al-Aas sent Dhiraar and Muslim army under his command to meet with mustered Sudanese christian auxiliaries of Beja. Before the battle, the Rashidun army camped in a place which called Dashur. Benjamin Hendrickx reported that the African christians has mustered around 20,000 Sudanese symmachoi corps, 1,300 elephants mounted archers, and anti cavalry units named al-Quwwad which armed with iron sticks,which led by a Patrician named Batlus. Meanwhile, al-Maqqari even stated 50,000 christian army of Byzantine Sudanese christian alliance in the "Battle of Darishkur".  the record of al-Maqrizi stated in this conflict, Dhiraar along with Miqdad ibn Aswad, Zubayr ibn al-Awwam, and Uqba ibn Amir each commanding muslims cavalry facing the Elephant corps led by Byzantine exarchate commander named Batlus. The Rashidun cavalry armed with spears ignited in flames that tip soaked in Santonin plants and Sulphur which were used drive the elephants flee in terror, scared with the flaming spears. while the elephant riders were toppled from the elephant's back and crushed underfoot on the ground. Meanwhile, the al-Quwwad warriors who used iron staffs were routed by the Rashidun cavalry soldiers who used a seized chain weapons to disarm the staff weapons of the al-Quwwad corps of Byzantine.

Siege of Bahnasa city 
After the victory in Darishkur, the Byzantine Sudanese forces flee to Bahnasa town and locked the gates, which then followed by the Muslims besiege the town, as the enemy were reinforced by an arrival of 50,000 according to the report of al-Maqqari. The siege dragged for months, until Khalid ibn al Walid commanded Zubayr ibn al-Awwam, Dhiraar ibn al-Azwar and other commanders to intensify the siege and assign them to lead around 10,000 Companions of the Prophet, with 70 among them were veterans of battle of Badr. They besiege the city for 4 months as Dhiraar leading 200 horsemen, while Zubayr ibn Al-Awwam lead 300 horsemen, while the other commanders such as Miqdad, Abdullah ibn Umar and Uqba ibn Amir al-Juhani leading similar number with Dhiraar with each command 200 horsemen. the Byzantines and their Copt allies showering the Rashidun army with arrows and stones, until the Rashidun overcame the defenders, as Dhiraar, the first emerge, came out from the battle with his entire body stained in blood, while confessed he personally slayed about 160 Byzantine soldiers during the battle. Muslim army managed to breach the gate and storming the city and forcing surrender to the inhabitant.  According to chronicles, the siege  of Bahnasa were so fierce that in this battle alone, 5,000 Companions of the prophet (Sahabah) were perished during this battle, as the thousands of their tombs were still can be seen in the modern day.

Historical death controversy 
It is widely accepted by the consensus of historians that Dhiraar died in Syria from the Plague of Emmaus, the plague that killed many other Companions of Muhammad, including Abu Ubaidah ibn al-Jarrah. The year of his death is believed to be 18 AH/640 AD and his final resting place is in Syria. The tomb shrine believed belong to Dhiraar were located in the town of Deir Alla in the Central Jordan Valley, northwest of Jordan. It is a modern mosque, a wide courtyard, and a garden decorated with trees.

Yet, other accounts of Dhiraar ibn al-Azwar's death exist. For instance, Ibn 'Abd al-Barr said he fell at the Battle of Ajnadayn. This is contrary to al-Waqidi's report which said he fell at the Battle of Yamama. Also, it was reported by Ibn Hajjar that after Dhiraar murdered Malik ibn Nuwayrah and committed adultery with a female slave taken from the campaign, General Khalid was ordered by Caliph Umar to execute him due to his crimes. However, before Khalid received the order to execute Dhiraar, he was already dead. There is some controversy regarding the textual translations, which make it difficult to discern if Dhiraar died at that time or not (regardless of the cause), as it is recorded by Bayhaqi. On the other hand, al-Tabari explained in his book regarding the conflicted report where there are two version of his death. the first was Dhiraar was said killed in battle of Ajnadayn, while the other saying he has been fallen in the battle of Yamama that Dhiraar appeared at the battle of Yarmouk. Ya'qubi even wrote that he lived long enough to witness the Battle of Qadisiyah and that together with Tulayha, Amru ibn Ma'adi Yakrib and Kurt ibn Jammah al-Abdi, he discovered the corpse of Rostam Farrokhzād. Having said that, the chronicle of Ya'qubi was plagued with skepticism due to his excessive Shi'i sympathies.

Ibn Hajar al-Asqalani recorded in his work Fath al-Bari about Muhammad al-Bukhari commentary that the weakness in the narrative chain of the death of Dhiraar in Yamamah. Ibn Hajar further surmised that there were two different persons called Dhiraar. The first was Dhiraar ibn al-Azwar from the Asad tribe and the other named Dhiraar ibn al-Khattab. Thus, some chroniclers like Abd al-Barr made the mistake of identifying those two different persons as one. Although the confusion was evident here, the older chroniclers such as Abu Ismail al-Azdi and Sayf ibn Umar were conscious of the existence of two different Dhiraars but they also recorded that both Dhiraar al-Azwar and Dhiraar ibn al-Khattab were present in the Syrian campaign, particularly at the Battle of Yarmouk, thus dismissing al-Barr and al-Waqidi's claims. , Jordanian Hadith expert and pupil of Muhammad Nasiruddin al-Albani, has warned in his book against the tradition which authored from Waqidi regarding the death of Dhiraar in the battle of Yamama as inauthentic narration. Meanwhile, Mahmud Shakir also recorded both Dhiraar ibn al Azwar and Dhiraar ibn al Khattab had lived long enough passing battle of Yamama and attended the battle of Qadisiyyah.

Legacy

As Sahabi, Dhiraar narrated traditions from Muhammad were accepted as Hadith. Dirar ibn al-Azwar Mosque was built in his commemoration which located to the northern part of the Jordan Valley adjacent the mausoleum of Abu Ubaidah ibn al-Jarrah, in an area which witnessed the first battles between the Muslims and the Byzantine Empire.

The sword supposedly belong to Dhiraar were now preserved in the Topkapı Palace Museum, Turkey

Al-Zarrar MBT used by the Pakistan Army is named in his honour.

Socio-political 
There is records regarding the modern era historiography study of the conquest of al-Bahnasa, as Sudan history researchers said the old chronicles from traditional History of Bahnasa conquest,  supported al-Maqrizi narration of the background for this Arabic invasions to Sudan., though MacMichaels doubt it. Nevertheless, al Dukhayli mentioned there are several battle poetries regarding the battle of Darishkur that allegedly recited by several Muslim leaders during the battle, such as Dhiraar, Zubayr ibn al-Awwam, al-Qa'qa' ibn Amr al-Tamimi, and others. Meanwhile, modern era excavation and archaeological research teams from Egyptian ministry also put interests to the tombs of the Muslims fallen during the battle, and alleged encampment of the Rashidun army during the campaign, where Dhiraar has participated. Dhiraar was fluently accomplished poet who attributed many of his poetic narration to fuel up his expression towards Jihad and Islamic stance. It was studied as the historical heritage of Iraq.

The Dharri clan or also known as the Zarari were Arabian tribe in modern day Iraq who are allegedly traced their ancestry as descendant of Dhiraar ibn al-Azwar.

In popular culture
Several 20th-century films made about Muslim conquests included Dhiraar as one of the cast:
 Syrian actor Ahmed Slan played the role of Dhiraar ibn al-Azwar in the first season of the series Khalid ibn al-Walid, directed by the Jordanian Mohammed Azizia.
 Egyptian actor Abdullah Ghaith played the role in the series Under the Shade of Swords, by the Egyptian director Saeed Al-Rashidi

Appendix

Notes

Primary sources 
 Mustadrak al-Hakim; Al-Hakim al-Nishapuri
 Futuh as-Sham; Abu Ismail al Azdi 
 Tarikh al-Rusul wal-Muluk; Muhammad ibn Jarir al-Tabari
 Futuh as-Sham; Waqidi
 Futuh al-Bahnasa; Taqī al-Dīn Abū al-'Abbās Aḥmad ibn 'Alī ibn 'Abd al-Qādir ibn Muḥammad al-Maqrīzī
 Sirah; Ibn Hisham
 Usd al-ghabah fi marifat al-Saḥabah; Ali ibn al-Athir
 Kitāb al-futūh al-kabīr wa-l-ridda; Sayf ibn Umar
 Mu'jam al-Buldan; Yaqut al-Hamawi
 Sahih al-Bukhari; Muhammad al-Bukhari
 Al-Isti'ab fi ma'rifat al-ashab; Ibn 'Abd al-Barr

References

Bibliography

External links
Photos of Maqam Dirar ben al Azwar at the American Center of Research

7th-century deaths from plague (disease)
Arab generals
Arab people of the Arab–Byzantine wars
People from the Rashidun Caliphate
Sahabah hadith narrators
Muslim conquest of Egypt
People of the Muslim conquest of Persia
People of the Muslim conquest of the Levant